Nemakščiai   is a small town in Kaunas County in central Lithuania. In 2011 it had a population of 748.

History
The Jewish population was important in the town. In 1941, the Jews were massacred by an Einsatzgruppen. Different mass executions occurred. One of them was on August 22, 340 women and children were murdered while the Jewish men were taken to the railway station of Viduklė for slave work, where they were later killed.

References

This article was initially translated from the Lithuanian Wikipedia.

Towns in Lithuania
Towns in Kaunas County
Shtetls
Holocaust locations in Lithuania